Pakistan participated in the 2nd South Asian Games held in Dhaka, Bangladesh between 26 and 20 December 1985. Its medal tally of 59 placed it second amongst the seven nations. The country participated in the following sports: athletics, boxing, kabbadi, swimming, weightlifting and wrestling.

Athletes 
 Athletics:
 Boxing: 
 Kabbadi: 
 Swimming:
 Weightlifting:
 Wrestling:

References

1985 South Asian Games
1985 in Pakistani sport
Pakistan at the South Asian Games